Dobrošin is a village in the municipality of Gornji Vakuf, Bosnia and Herzegovina.

Population

References

Populated places in Gornji Vakuf-Uskoplje